Moritz Grand (born 4 December 1923) was a Swiss rower. He competed in the men's eight event at the 1948 Summer Olympics.

References

External links
 

1923 births
Possibly living people
Swiss male rowers
Olympic rowers of Switzerland
Rowers at the 1948 Summer Olympics
Place of birth missing